This is a list of British game shows. A game show is a type of radio, television, or internet programming genre in which contestants, television personalities or celebrities, sometimes as part of a team, play a game which involves answering questions or solving puzzles usually for money and/or prizes.

Activity-orientated

Dating/Relationship

Panel games 
In these, celebrities compete, usually in two teams.

Puzzle-orientated

Quiz

Reality television

Other shows

References

Game shows, UK
Game shows
British